KWCV may refer to:

 KWCV (FM), a radio station (88.9 FM) licensed to serve Walnut Ridge, Arkansas, United States
 KSCW-DT, a television station (channel 12, virtual 33) licensed to serve Wichita, Kansas, United States, which held the call sign KWCV from 1988 to 2006